Stichosome (from Greek stichos (στίχος) =  row; soma (σῶµα) = body) is a multicellular organ that is very prominent in some stages of nematodes and consists of a longitudinal series of glandular unicellular cells (stichocytes) arranged in a row along the oesophagus that form the posterior esophageal glands. It opens into the esophageal lumen and apparently functions as a secretory gland and storage organ.

References

Helminthology
Nematode anatomy